The 2018–19 Ligue 1 Mauritania is the 39th season of the Ligue 1 Mauritania, the top-tier football league in Mauritania. The season started on 28 September 2018 and ended on 4 May 2019.

Final standings

References

Mauritanian Premier League seasons
Premier League
Premier League
Mauritania